In pathology, hyaloserositis is the coating of an organ with a fibrous hyaline, resulting from inflammation of the serous membrane (serositis) covering the organ.

The spleen is commonly affected and often referred to as sugar-coated spleen.  The liver and heart are also sometimes affected and referred to as frosted liver (or sugar-coated liver) and frosted heart respectively.

Hyaloserositis of the spleen is usually considered benign, i.e. it does not necessitate any treatment.

See also
Hyaline
Serositis

References

Gross pathology